Béla Koplárovics (born 7 June 1981) is a former Hungarian international football player.

Club career
Koplárovics started his club career with Hévíz FC before moving to reigning Nemzeti Bajnokság I champions Zalaegerszegi TE in the summer of 2002. He became famous in Hungary during the 2002–03 season, after scoring the winner against Manchester United in the 92nd minute of a UEFA Champions League third qualifying round match.

Koplárovics would stay with ZTE for seven seasons before moving on to Pécsi MFC in 2008. After one season with PMFC, Koplárovics left Hungary for the first time to join NK Nafta Lendava in the Slovenian PrvaLiga. This was followed by brief spells with Shensa Arak in Iran, his first club Hévíz FC, and Kozármisleny SE, before moving to Austrian club TSV Utzenaich in 2011.

References

External links
 Béla Koplárovics at magyarfutball.hu
 
 Béla Koplárovics at HLSZ
 Stats from Slovenia at PrvaLiga
 Stats from Hungarian Championship at Futball-Adattár
 Match report of the game against Manchester United on UEFA.com

1981 births
Living people
People from Kaposvár
Hungarian footballers
Hungarian expatriate footballers
Hévíz FC footballers
Zalaegerszegi TE players
Pécsi MFC players
Kozármisleny SE footballers
NK Nafta Lendava players
Expatriate footballers in Slovenia
Shensa players
Expatriate footballers in Iran
Association football midfielders
People from Barcs
Hungary international footballers
Sportspeople from Somogy County